Alex Ross (born January 12, 1968) is an American music critic and author who specializes in classical music. Ross has been a staff member of The New Yorker magazine since 1996. His extensive writings include performance and record reviews, industry updates, cultural commentary, and historical narratives in the realm of classical music. He has written three well-received books: The Rest Is Noise: Listening to the Twentieth Century (2007), Listen to This (2011), and Wagnerism: Art and Politics in the Shadow of Music (2020).

A graduate of Harvard University and student of composer Peter Lieberson, from 1992 to 1996 Ross was a critic for The New York Times. He has received wide acclaim for his publications; The Rest Is Noise was a finalist for the 2008 Pulitzer Prize for General Nonfiction, and his other awards and honors include a MacArthur Fellowship and the Belmont Prize. He maintains a popular classical music blog, The Rest is Noise.

Life and career
Alex Ross was born on January 12, 1968, in Washington, D.C. He attended the Potomac School in McLean, Virginia and St. Albans School in Washington, DC, graduating in 1986. He was a 1990 graduate of Harvard University, where he studied under composer Peter Lieberson and was a DJ on the classical and underground rock departments of the college radio station, WHRB. During his time at Harvard he first began music criticism, writing reviews for Fanfare, a classical music magazine.

From 1992 to 1996 Ross was a music critic at The New York Times. He also wrote for The New Republic, Slate, the London Review of Books, Lingua Franca, Fanfare and Feed. He first contributed to The New Yorker in 1993 and became a staff writer in 1996, succeeding Paul Griffiths. The music critic Edward Rothstein describes him as "trying to restore critical vigour by loosening the boundaries isolating the classical tradition from the world of politics and popular culture". Ross maintains a popular classical music blog, The Rest is Noise. The musicologist Lars Helgert described the blog as "among the most highly regarded web resources for classical music criticism".

His first book, The Rest Is Noise: Listening to the Twentieth Century, a cultural history of music since 1900, was released in the U.S. in 2007 by Farrar, Straus and Giroux and in the U.K. in 2008. The book received widespread critical praise in the U.S., garnering a National Book Critics Circle Award, a spot on The New York Times list of the ten best books of 2007, and a finalist citation for the Pulitzer Prize in general nonfiction. It was also shortlisted for the 2008 Samuel Johnson Prize for nonfiction. His second book, Listen to This, was released in the U.S. in September 2010 by Farrar, Straus and Giroux and was published in the U.K. in November 2010. In September 2020, his third book, Wagnerism, came out.

Ross married director Jonathan Lisecki in Canada in 2006. He is now based in New York City, living in Chelsea, Manhattan.

Selected bibliography

Awards and honors
Ross has received a MacArthur Fellowship (2008), three ASCAP Deems Taylor Awards for music writing, and a Holtzbrinck fellowship at the American Academy in Berlin. In 2012 he received the Belmont Prize for Contemporary Music at the pèlerinages Art Festival in Weimar. In 2016, he was awarded the Champion of New Music award by the American Composers Forum.

References

Notes

Citations

Sources

External links 
  – Classical music blog
 Articles by Alex Ross on The New Yorker
 Interview with Alex Ross on WQXR-FM
 Interview with Alex Ross on The Next Track podcast
 Interview with Alex Ross on WGLT
 Interview with Alex Ross on NPR

1968 births
Living people
Place of birth missing (living people)
American bloggers
American music critics
American music journalists
Harvard University alumni
Opera critics
St. Albans School (Washington, D.C.) alumni
American gay writers
MacArthur Fellows
21st-century American non-fiction writers
The New Yorker critics
Classical music critics
Fellows of the American Academy of Arts and Sciences
Writers from Washington, D.C.
American male non-fiction writers
American male bloggers
Wagner scholars